Esther Waters is a British period television series which originally aired on BBC Two in four episodes from 10 April to 1 May 1977. It is an adaptation of the 1894 novel of the same title by George Moore. A previous BBC version Esther Waters had been produced in 1964, although it is now lost.

Main cast
 Gabrielle Lloyd as Esther Waters
 James Laurenson as William Latch
 Alison Steadman as Sarah
 Paul Jesson as Porter
 Jill Balcon as Mrs. Barfield
 David Burke as Fred Parsons
 Ellis Dale as  Mr. Randal

References

Bibliography
Baskin, Ellen . Serials on British Television, 1950-1994. Scolar Press, 1996.

External links
 

BBC television dramas
1977 British television series debuts
1977 British television series endings
1970s British drama television series
1970s British television miniseries
English-language television shows
Television shows based on British novels
Television series set in the 19th century